Mud Lake is an unorganized territory located in Marshall County, Minnesota, United States. In both the 2000 and 2010 U.S. censuses, the unorganized territory recorded a population of 0.

History
Mud Lake was organized as Mud Lake Township, and named for a former lake that has since been drained.

Geography 
According to the United States Census Bureau, the unorganized territory has a total area of 36.0 square miles (93.2 km2), of which 31.3 square miles (81.1 km2) is land and 4.7 square miles (12.1 km2) (13.03%) is water.

Demographics 
As of the census of 2000, there were no people living in the unorganized territory.

References

Populated places in Marshall County, Minnesota
Unorganized territories in Minnesota